Howie Centre is a community in the Canadian province of Nova Scotia, located in the Cape Breton Regional Municipality on Cape Breton Island. The community has a school, Mountainview Elementary, which is a complex with East Bay Elementary.

References

 Howie Centre on Destination Nova Scotia

External links
 Mountainview School (Cape Breton - Victoria Regional School Board)

Communities in the Cape Breton Regional Municipality
General Service Areas in Nova Scotia